Peculiaroso is an album by American guitarist Leo Kottke, released in 1994.

History
Coming more than two years after the Great Big Boy album, where all tracks included vocal parts, Peculiaroso returned to Kottke's usual mix of vocal and instrumental selections.  The album included several notable cover versions, including an instrumental take on the Sutherland Brothers' "Arms of Mary" and a version of Randall Hylton's "Room at the Top of the Stairs" which received some airplay on Adult Alternative radio.

The album was produced by singer-songwriter Rickie Lee Jones, who also provided backing vocals on several tracks.  Kottke credited Jones with capturing a more spontaneous and relaxed feel on the recording than was typical of his own attempts.

Peculiaroso was re-released on CD as a "twofer" with Great Big Boy by Acadia (8182) on October 29, 2007.

Reception

Writing for Allmusic, music critic Jeff Crooke wrote of the album "... this release, well produced by Rickie Lee Jones, is at turns humorous, haunting, and highly enjoyable."

Track listing
All songs by Leo Kottke except as noted
 "Peg Leg" – 3:27
 "Poor Boy" (Bukka White, John Fahey) – 3:07
 "Parade" – 2:49
 "Wonderland by Night" (Klaus Gunter-Newman, Lincoln Chase) – 3:30
 "World Made to Order" – 3:47
 "Room Service (At the Tahiti Hotel)" – 2:52
 "Turning into Randolph Scott (Humid Child)" – 3:42
 "Porky and Pale" – 2:26
 "Arms of Mary" (Ian Sutherland) – 3:06
 "The Room at the Top of the Stairs" (Randall Hylton) – 2:41
 "Big Situation" – 3:15
 "Twilight Time" (Buck Ram, Morty Nevins, Al Nevins) – 1:50

Personnel
Leo Kottke – guitar, vocals
Dean Parks – electric guitar
Van Dyke Parks – accordion
John Leftwich – bass
Bill Berg – drums
Brad Dutz – percussion
Rickie Lee Jones – vocals
Syd Straw – vocals
Teresa Tudbury – vocals
Production notes:
Produced by Rickie Lee Jones
Recorded and Mixed: Paul duGre
Assistant engineers: Dan Bosworth, Mark Duilbeault, Noel Hazen & Marnie Riley
Mastered by Joe Gastwirt

References

External links
 Leo Kottke official site
 Unofficial Leo Kottke web site (fan site)

1994 albums
Leo Kottke albums
Private Music albums